The name Frank has been used for 14 Tropical cyclones worldwide:

In the Eastern Pacific Ocean (8):
 Tropical Storm Frank (1980)
 Hurricane Frank (1986)
 Hurricane Frank (1992)
 Tropical Storm Frank (1998)
 Hurricane Frank (2004)
 Hurricane Frank (2010)
 Hurricane Frank (2016)
 Hurricane Frank (2022) 

In the Philippines by PAGASA in the Western Pacific Ocean (2):
 Typhoon Conson (2004) (T0404, 07W, Frank) – made landfall as a minimal tropical storm in the Kōchi Prefecture, Japan
 Typhoon Fengshen (2008) (T0806, 07W, Frank)– made a direct hit on the Philippines and on China, causing severe damage and resulted in at least 1,371 deaths
The name Frank was retired after the 2008 typhoon season in the Philippine Area of Responsibility and was replaced by the name Ferdie.

In the Australian region (2):
 Severe Tropical Cyclone Frank (1984)
 Severe Tropical Cyclone Frank (1995)

In the South Pacific Ocean (1):
 Severe Tropical Cyclone Frank (1999)

In the Southwest Indian Ocean (1):
 Intense Tropical Cyclone Frank (2004)

Pacific hurricane set index articles
Pacific typhoon set index articles
Australian region cyclone set index articles
South Pacific cyclone set index articles
South-West Indian Ocean cyclone set index articles